The Canadian Geographer is a quarterly peer-reviewed academic journal, published by Wiley-Blackwell on behalf of the Canadian Association of Geographers.

Description
The journal was established in 1950.  Its  editor-in-chief is Nadine Schuurman. The journal publishes contemporary geographical research that addresses significant social, scientific and technical issues in Canada and globally. 

According to the Journal Citation Reports, the journal had a 2011 impact factor of 0.561, ranking it 54th out of 73 journals in the category "Geography".

See also
 List of social science journals

References

External links

 

English-language journals
Geography journals
Publications established in 1950
Quarterly journals
Wiley-Blackwell academic journals